Martín Núñez (born February 2, 1987 in Montevideo) is a Uruguayan footballer.

Career

Youth and college
Núñez moved with his family to the United States when he was nine years old, settling in Miami, Florida. He attended Miami Sunset Senior High School, with whom he won the Florida State 6A championship in both 2004 and 2005, was named a first team All State in 2005, and was recognized as the Miami Herald Florida Player of the Year class 6A, the Florida State Final Four MVP and the Miami Herald Player of the Year as he led the team with thirty-four goals.

Núñez played college soccer at Georgia Perimeter College where he was a 2006 second team National Junior College All American, leading the nation with thirty goals. He left school after his freshman year to pursue a professional career.

Professional
Núñez was drafted in the second round (22nd overall) of the 2007 USL College Player Draft by Miami FC, but he chose not to sign with the team. In 2008, he was offered a contract with the New York Red Bulls of Major League Soccer, but again he chose to not sign with them; instead, he signed with the Carolina RailHawks of the USL First Division on March 15, 2008. He immediately cemented a spot in the RailHawks' midfield, playing twenty-eight games and scoring five goals. His efforts were rewarded when he was named one of three finalists for the Rookie of the Year award, an award ultimately won by Osvaldo Alonso.

In January 2009, Núñez traveled to Puerto Rico to join the Puerto Rico Islanders of the USL-1 at their training camp on trial, signing with the club on February 18. He went on to play 14 games for the Islanders in 2009, helping them to the final of the 2009 CFU Club Championship, before being released at the end of the season.

He signed for Miami FC of the USSF Division 2 Professional League in 2010 and re-signed with the club, now called Fort Lauderdale Strikers and playing in the North American Soccer League, on February 8, 2011.

On March 6, 2012, Nuñez was traded to Minnesota Stars FC by the Strikers in exchange for Jack Stewart.

Nuñez was let go by Minnesota Stars FC after the 2012 season and went on trial with FC Edmonton. Edmonton declined to sign him.

In August 2013, Nuñez again signed with Fort Lauderdale Strikers. He remained with the club through the end of 2014.

Nuñez signed with Tampa Bay Rowdies in December 2014. He was released in November 2015.

Honors

Puerto Rico Islanders
CFU Club Championship Runner-up (1): 2009

References

External links
 Tampa Bay Rowdies bio

1987 births
Living people
Uruguayan footballers
North Carolina FC players
Puerto Rico Islanders players
Miami FC (2006) players
Fort Lauderdale Strikers players
Minnesota United FC (2010–2016) players
Tampa Bay Rowdies players
Footballers from Montevideo
Uruguayan expatriate footballers
Uruguayan emigrants to the United States
USL First Division players
USSF Division 2 Professional League players
North American Soccer League players
Uruguayan expatriate sportspeople in Puerto Rico
Expatriate soccer players in the United States
Expatriate footballers in Puerto Rico
Association football midfielders